The Nokia 2100 is a mobile phone announced on 4 November 2001 and released in late 2001.

It is a derivative of the more popular Nokia 1100 and serves as a spiritual successor to the Nokia 8210, sharing a similar button layout and small dimension. It is rebranded as Nokia 3610 for some markets.

It also included some of the popular Nokia games available, which were Space Impact, Snake II and Link5. Space Impact most notably, included better graphics than the Nokia 3310 and others, but being more slow and having bad framerate.

Despite having black and white display, and it having low resolution, Nokia 2100 included graphic redactor for images, which people could then save and send via MMS.

On the back it included a slot, in which people could insert a small photograph, or a very slim object, and see it through the plastic cover.

It was succeeded by the Nokia 2115 in 2005.

References

Mobile phones introduced in 2003
2100